Marie Reine is a hamlet in northwest Alberta, Canada within Northern Sunrise County.

The French Canadian community got its start in 1949-1952 when settlers from Quebec and France migrated west for a better future. The hamlet has a unique community plan laid out by L’Abbe Pierre Paul Pothier where each lot is a twenty-acre strip abutting Highway 744.

Demographics 
The population of Marie Reine according to the 2010 municipal census conducted by Northern Sunrise County is 67.

Amenities 
The hamlet has a community hall and a post office.

See also 
List of communities in Alberta
List of hamlets in Alberta

References 

Hamlets in Alberta
Northern Sunrise County